Cenadi is a  and town in the province of Catanzaro in the Calabria region of Italy.

Etymology 
A legend claims that St. John the Evangelist was passing through the town on his way to Rome, and stopped for dinner.

References

Cities and towns in Calabria